was a private university in Fuji City, Shizuoka Prefecture Japan.

The predecessor of the school was founded in 1990, and it was chartered as a university in 2000. The university had three departments:

College of Distribution Economics
College of Environment and Disaster Research 
University Library

External links
 Official website 

Educational institutions established in 1990
Universities and colleges in Shizuoka Prefecture
Defunct private universities and colleges in Japan
1990 establishments in Japan